Hon. George Hamilton MA (11 August 1718 – 26 November 1787) was a Canon of Windsor from 1783 to 1787.

Family

He was the third surviving son on James Hamilton, 7th Earl of Abercorn and Anne Plumer.

He married Elizabeth Onslow, daughter of Lt.-Gen. Richard Onslow and Pooley Walton, and they had the following children
George Hamilton (d. 11 October 1782)
Anne Hamilton (6 October 1755 – 18 December 1795)
Mary Hamilton (b. 26 November 1756)
Harriot Hamilton (11 January 1760 – 15 March 1788)
Catherine Hamilton (b. 7 Jun 1763)
Elizabeth Hamilton (5 June 1765 – 1843), married Glynn Wynn on 13 November 1793, without issue
Rachel Hamilton (b. 17 Oct 1766)
Jane Hamilton (26 Feb 1768 – 1831)
Lady Cecil Hamilton (15 Mar 1770 – 19 Jun 1819), married John Hamilton, 1st Marquess of Abercorn
Isabella Hamilton (28 Sep 1772 – 19 December 1852), married Lord George Seymour

Career

He matriculated at Exeter College, Oxford on 19 March 1735/6 and received a BA on 5 February 1739/40. He then entered Merton College, Oxford and graduated MA in 1742.

He was appointed:
Prebendary of Woodford and Wilsford in Salisbury Cathedral 1756
Vicar of St Michael's Church, Bray 1759 - 1787
Rector of Taplow

He was appointed to the fifth stall in St George's Chapel, Windsor Castle in 1783, a position he held until he died in 1787.

Notes 

1718 births
1787 deaths
Canons of Windsor
Alumni of Exeter College, Oxford
Alumni of Merton College, Oxford
Younger sons of earls
Onslow family